The  is a DC commuter electric multiple unit (EMU) train type operated by Keio Corporation in Tokyo, Japan. Introduced into service on 9 January 1996, a total of 29 five-car sets were built between 1995 and 2010 by Tokyu Car Corporation and Nippon Sharyo in six batches for use on the Keio Inokashira Line.

Variants
, the fleet consists of 29 five-car trainsets.

Batches 1-2
Sets 1701 to 1710. Formation consists of two motor and three trailer cars.

Batches 3-4
Sets 1711 to 1715. Formation consists of three motor and two trailer cars. Raised driver's position.

Batches 5-6
Sets 1721 to 1734. Formation consists of three motor and two trailer cars. Beadless stainless steel bodysides. Full-colour LED destination indicator panels. Interior includes 17-inch colour LCD information panels.

Formations

Sets 1701 to 1710 (unrefurbished)
The first ten sets, 1701 to 1710, were originally formed as follows with two motored ("M") cars and three non-powered trailer ("T") cars, and car 1 at the Kichijoji (western) end.

Cars 2, 3, and 4 each have one single-arm pantograph. Car 3 is designated a mildly air-conditioned car. Car 1 has a wheelchair space.

Refurbished sets 1701 to 1710
The refurbished sets are formed as follows with three motored ("M") cars and two non-powered trailer ("T") cars, and car 1 at the Kichijoji (western) end.

Cars 2, 3, and 4 each have one single-arm pantograph.

Sets 1711 to 1715, 1721 to 1734
Sets 1711 to 1715 and 1721 to 1734 are formed as follows with three motored ("M") cars and two non-powered trailer ("T") cars, and car 1 at the Kichijoji (western) end.

Cars 2, 3, and 4 each have one single-arm pantograph. Car 3 is designated a mildly air-conditioned car. Car 1 has a wheelchair space.

History
The 1000 series sets were initially built by Tokyu Car Corp. The type entered service on 9 January 1996, and was the first new rolling stock introduced on the Keio Inokashira Line in three decades, after the 3000 series of 1962.

Third- and fourth-batch sets 1711 to 1715, built between 2003 and 2004, incorporate system and interior modifications.

A new batch of 14 (batches 5-6) 5-car 1000 series sets (1721–1734) built by Nippon Sharyo and Tokyu Car Corp were delivered between 2008 and 2010 to replace ageing rolling stock on the Inokashira Line. These new trains feature full-colour LED destination indicators.

Refurbishment
Starting in 2016, the original batch of ten sets is undergoing a programme of refurbishment. Refurbishment includes converting the centre trailer car to a motor car to provide three motored cars per five-car set, as is the case with later-build sets. The ten original sets are all scheduled to be refurbished by 2020.

Livery variations
The cab ends are painted one of several different pastel colours as shown below. The colour is also used for bodyside lining.

Sets 1706 and 1713 were originally painted in a beige colour scheme. Their schemes were changed to orange-beige in 2010. 

Set 1729 was repainted in a new "rainbow" colour scheme from 3 October 2012.

References

External links

 Tokyu Car Corp - 1000 series

1000 series
Electric multiple units of Japan

Train-related introductions in 1996
Nippon Sharyo multiple units
1500 V DC multiple units of Japan
Tokyu Car multiple units